The nuraghe Seruci is an important archaeological site, located in the municipality of Gonnesa, in the Iglesiente region of Sardinia.

The nuraghe
The nuraghe is of the complex type, it consists of a central tower surrounded by five other towers, some of which are in good condition. The towers have their summit collapsed but originally their tops were crowned with battlements in stone.

From the nuraghe, being located in a hill of strategic importance, is possible to observe the entire surrounding area.

The village
The nuraghe is surrounded by a village, one of the largest in Sardinia, with about a hundred and fifty huts grouped in "residential areas" divided by narrow streets. The settlements covers 7 hectares, the huts are circular and in some of them is possible to see the use of architectural solutions that are rarely found in the other nuraghic villages; for example the use of partition walls inside of the huts and the addition of other environments of varying shape around the usual living environment.

At the center of the village is located a hut of vast size that probably was the meeting hut of the community.

Near the village and the nuraghe are also present at least three giants' tomb, the typical burials of nuragic Sardinia.

Bibliography 
A. Taramelli, Gonnesa - Indagini nella cittadella nuragica di Seruci (Cagliari), in Monumenti antichi della Reale Accademia dei Lincei, XXIX, 1917;
V. Santoni-G. Bacco, L'isolato A del villaggio nuragico di Seruci-Gonnesa. Lo scavo della capanna 5, in Un millennio di relazioni tra la Sardegna e i paesi del Mediterraneo, Cagliari, 1987;
V. Santoni-G. Bacco, L'isolato A del villaggio nuragico di Seruci-Gonnesa: lo scavo dei vani 3 e 6, in Quaderni della Soprintendenza Archeologica per le province di Cagliari e Oristano, 5, 1988.

External links
SardegnaCultura.it - Gonnesa, Complesso di Seruci
Il portale sardo, Villaggio Nuragico di Seruci

Buildings and structures in Sardinia
Archaeological sites in Sardinia
Former populated places in Italy
Tourist attractions in Sardinia
Nuraghe